N° 2 is the second studio album by French musician Serge Gainsbourg, released in 1959. It features Gainsbourg backed by the Alain Goraguer Orchestra. The album was not well received at the time of its release.

Music journalist and Gainsbourg biographer Sylvie Simmons described the album as "...mutant jazz-pop engaged in an unnatural act with chanson, French literature and Americana..."

The album cover is a reference to French author and musician Boris Vian. The cover of Lovage's 2001 debut album pays homage to the cover.

Track listing

Personnel
Credits adapted from liner notes.

 Serge Gainsbourg – vocals
 Léo Petit - guitar
 Paul Rovère, Pierre Michelot – double bass
 Christian Garros – drums
 Alain Goraguer – piano, arrangements, conductor
Alain Goraguer et Son Orchestre - orchestra 
Georges Grenu, Jo Hrasko, Marcel Hrasko, Pierre Gossez, William Boucaya - saxophone
Fernand Verstraete, Fred Gérard, Maurice Thomas, Roger Guérin - trumpet
André Paquinet, Charles Verstraete - trombone
Gaby Vilain - bass trombone
Technical
 Denis Bourgeois – executive production
Jacques Aubert - photography

References

External links
 
 

1959 albums
Serge Gainsbourg albums
Philips Records albums
French-language albums